Pont Lliw railway station served the village of Pontlliw, in the historical county of Glamorganshire, Wales, from 1923 to 1924 on the Swansea District Line.

History 
The station was opened on 9 July 1923 by the Great Western Railway. It was a short-lived station, closing a year later on 22 September 1924. It was later used in 1945 for entertaining troops.

References 

Disused railway stations in Swansea
Former Great Western Railway stations
Railway stations in Great Britain opened in 1923
Railway stations in Great Britain closed in 1924
1923 establishments in Wales
1924 disestablishments in Wales